Arnaldo Forlani,  (born 8 December 1925) is an Italian former politician and statesman who served as the 43rd prime minister of Italy from 18 October 1980 to 28 June 1981. He also held the office of deputy prime minister, minister of Foreign Affairs and minister of Defence.

A member of the right-wing faction of the Christian Democracy party, Forlani was one of the most prominent Italian politicians from the 1970s to early 1990s. At  years old, he is both the oldest living and the longest-lived prime minister of Italy.

Early life and career
Forlani was born in Pesaro, Marche, from a middle-class family. In 1948, after the degree in law at the University of Urbino, Forlani began his political career, holding the position of provincial secretary of Christian Democracy for Pesaro; he was later elected in the municipal and provincial councils. In 1954 he became a member of the central committee of Christian Democracy.

In the 1958 Italian general election, Forlani was elected in the Chamber of Deputies for the first time, representing the constituency of Ancona. In 1959, Forlani became one of the most prominent member of the DC faction led by Amintore Fanfani. In 1962 he was appointed vice-secretary of the party; he held this office until 1969, under three different secretaries, Aldo Moro, Mariano Rumor and Flaminio Piccoli.

Christian Democratic secretary

In December 1968, Forlani was appointed Minister of Public Shares in the government led by Mariano Rumor; in August 1969 he became Minister for the Relations with the United Nations, in the Rumor's second cabinet. In November 1969 Forlani was elected Secretary of the Christian Democracy with 157 votes in favor and 13 blank votes; after few days Ciriaco De Mita became his vice-secretary. During his secretariat, Forlani tried to avoid the disintegration of the center-left political alliance, undermined by the inability to react effectively to the economic and social difficulties of the period. He also tried to strength the Organic Centre-left coalition with the Socialist Party, the Democratic Socialist Party and the Republican Party.

In November 1969, the Parliament approved the divorce law with a different majority from the one which supported the government; in fact the law was harshly opposed by the Christian Democrats, but also by the Italian Social Movement and the Monarchists. Prime Minister Rumor resigned in February 1970, but tried to rebuild a centre-left government in March 1970. Despite the political success for the first regional elections of June 1970, the third Rumor government did not survive the political and social tensions that shocked the country, especially after the general strike of July 1970.
After Rumor's resignation, Emilio Colombo was appointed new Prime Minister at the head of a centre-left coalition.

In the 1971 presidential election, Forlani proposed Amintore Fanfani as DC candidate as President of the Republic, but his allies strongly opposed this decision and Fanfani was not elected. Forlani's second candidate was Aldo Moro, but also this nomination was rejected by the Parliament. At the end, the DC proposed Giovanni Leone, former Prime Minister and long-time President of the Chamber of Deputies, who was elected with the support of the neo-fascist Social Movement. After few months the republicans withdrew their support to Colombo's government and the new appointed Prime Minister Giulio Andreotti did not reach to gain the confidence vote from the Parliament; snap elections were called for May 1972.

1972 general election and DC Congress

In the general election, which took place on 7 May 1972, the DC, led by Forlani, remained stable with around 38% of the votes, as it happened to the Communist Party which obtained the same 27% of 1968. The Socialist Party continued in its decline, reducing to less than 10%. The most important growth was that of the post-fascist Italian Social Movement, which nearly doubled its votes from 4.5 to c. 9%, after that its leader Giorgio Almirante launched the formula of the "National Right", proposing his party as the sole group of the Italian right side.

Incumbent Prime Minister Giulio Andreotti, supported by secretary Forlani, tried to continue his centrist strategy, but his attempt only lasted a year. Former Premier Mariano Rumor so returned at the head of the government with his traditional centre-left alliance between Christian Democrats, Socialist, Democratic Socialist and Republicans. At the same time, during the 1973 National Congress, Forlani, who now opposed an alliance with the PSI, was not confirmed Secretary of the party, and his former mentor, Amintore Fanfani, became DC secretary once again.

Member of the government
In March 1973, Prime Minister Rumor was abandoned by the Republicans. He continued with a new squad, but he couldn't withstand the shocks deriving by the divorce referendum of 1974, when Christian Democrats, along with the neo-fascist MSI, intensely campaigned for a yes vote to abolish the law and make divorce illegal again, but their proposal was rejected by almost 60% of votes.

Minister of Defence

After the referendum, former Premier Aldo Moro persuaded the Socialists to accept a minority government composed only by the Christian Democrats and the Republicans. Forlani was appointed Minister of Defence by Moro. However, new problem arose from the regional elections of 1975, which marked a great success of the left, which consequently called for new national elections.

In March 1976, Forlani run to the secretariat of the party, opposing Benigno Zaccagnini, incumbent secretary and member of the DC left-wing, who supported Moro's policy of accommodation with the Communists of Enrico Berlinguer, known as Historic Compromise. Forlani was supported by Andreotti, Fanfani, Flaminio Piccoli and Antonio Bisaglia, but he lost the congressional election and Zaccagnini remained Christian Democratic secretary.

Minister of Foreign Affairs
When the Republicans left Moro's cabinet in 1976, no possibilities of a new government remained, and an early vote was called. After the election, which saw a great success of the Communist Party, Andreotti became the new Prime Minister and Forlani was appointed as Minister of Foreign Affairs.

The reasons of this important nomination were firstly the necessity to recover a climate of unity in the party after the congressional divisions and secondly the opportunity, in a world still marked by the Cold War, to allocate foreign policy to a clearly anti-communist personality, as Forlani was, able to calm the European and American partners. During his ministry, Forlani strongly supported the European integration process, and the adhesion of Portugal to the European Economic Community.

Prime Minister of Italy

In 1980, Forlani was among the main sponsor of Flaminio Piccoli in the party congress. Piccoli was elected Secretary at the head of a centre-right majority. Due to his fundamental role in Piccoli's election, Forlani was appointed Prime Minister of Italy, leading a centre to centre-left coalition with PSI, PSDI and PRI.

Forlani was considered an unflamboyant politician who attempted to stay out of the factionalism in his party, and was seen as the man who could re-unite DC. As Prime Minister, he had to deal with corruption scandals within his party and a renewed bout of left-wing terrorism.

1980 Irpinia earthquake

During his premiership, Forlani had to face also the Irpinia earthquake, a strong shock, that was centered on the village of Conza in Campania, and left at least 2,483 people dead, at least 7,700 injured, and left 250,000 homeless.

Forlani's government spent 59 trillion lire on reconstruction, while other nations sent contributions. West Germany contributed 32 million United States dollars (USD) and the United States US$70 million. However, in the early nineties a major corruption scandal emerged. Of the billions of lire that were predestined for aid to the victims and rebuilding, the largest part disappeared from the earthquake reconstruction funds in the 1980s. Of the $40 billion spent on earthquake reconstruction, an estimated $20 billion went to create an entirely new social class of millionaires in the region, $6.4 billion went to the Camorra, whereas another $4 billion went to politicians in bribes. Only the remaining $9.6 billion a quarter of the total amount, was actually spent on people's needs. Moreover, the Mafia entered the construction industry after the quake.

P2 scandal and resignation
During his premiership, the list of who belonged to the secret lodge P2 was published. The P2 was a Masonic lodge founded in 1945 that, by the time its Masonic charter was withdrawn in 1976, had transformed into a clandestine, pseudo-Masonic, ultraright organization operating in contravention of Article 18 of the Constitution of Italy that banned secret associations. In its latter period, during which the lodge was headed by Licio Gelli, P2 was implicated in numerous Italian crimes and mysteries, including the collapse of the Vatican-affiliated Banco Ambrosiano, the murders of journalist Mino Pecorelli and banker Roberto Calvi, and corruption cases within the nationwide bribe scandal Tangentopoli. P2 came to light through the investigations into the collapse of Michele Sindona's financial empire.

P2 was sometimes referred to as a "state within a state" or a "shadow government". The lodge had among its members prominent journalists, Members of Parliament, industrialists, and military leaders—including Silvio Berlusconi, who later became Prime Minister of Italy; the Savoy pretender to the Italian throne Victor Emmanuel; and the heads of all three Italian intelligence services (at the time SISDE, SISMI and CESIS).

When searching Gelli's villa in 1981, the police found a document called the "Plan for Democratic Rebirth", which called for a consolidation of the media, suppression of trade unions, and the rewriting of the Italian Constitution. However, the lateness with which they were published gained Forlani heavy criticism, in particular from the Communist Party. He was therefore compelled to resign from the position, staying away from spotlight of politics for a certain period. With his resignation and the appointment of Republican leader Giovanni Spadolini, the unbroken line since 1945 of Christian Democratic Prime Ministers came to an end.

After the premiership

After his premiership Forlani remained an important politician. In 1981, at a Socialist Congress, Forlani and Socialist leader Bettino Craxi signed an agreement with the "blessing" of Giulio Andreotti. As the agreement was signed in a trailer, it was called the "pact of the camper." The pact was also called "CAF" for the initials of the signers, Craxi-Andreotti-Forlani. With this agreement, the DC party recognized the equal dignity of the so-called "secular parties" of the majority (the Socialists, Social Democrats, Liberals and Republicans) and also guaranteed an alternation of government. With the birth of the so-called Pentapartito, the possibility of the growth of the majority toward the Communist Party was finally dismissed. The Christian Democrats remained the leaders of the coalition, and managed several times to prevent representatives of the secular parties from becoming Prime Minister.

In 1982, Forlani tried again to become DC Secretary, but he was defeated by his former deputy secretary Ciriaco De Mita, who was now supported also by Fanfani. After the loss, Forlani exited from Fanfani's faction and founded "Popular Action", along with Franco Maria Malfatti, Luciano Radi and Oscar Luigi Scalfaro. However he succeeded in remaining the leader of the moderate faction of the Christian Democracy, continuing to be one of the most prominent politician in Italian politics. In 1983 the Socialist leader Bettino Craxi was appointed Prime Minister by President Sandro Pertini and Forlani became his Deputy Prime Minister.

Second term as secretary
In the 18th DC National Congress Forlani was elected secretary for a second time, with 85% of votes; while former secretary Ciriaco De Mita became Prime Minister. De Mita maintained the head of the government, despite the constant difficulties of relations with Bettino Craxi.

The difficulties increased with the "Palermo case" when DC governed the city with Leoluca Orlando, allying with the Communists instead of the Socialists. Finally, Craxi withdrew the PSI's support to the government and De Mita was forced to resign on 19 May 1989. Forlani then managed the long-running government crisis that lasted until July, when Andreotti became Prime Minister leading a Pentapartito coalition. The CAF alliance remained the pivot of Italian politics for the rest of the legislature until the 1992 election.

1992 election and presidential ambitions

On 17 February 1992, judge Antonio Di Pietro had Mario Chiesa, a member of the PSI, arrested for accepting a bribe from a Milan cleaning firm. The Italian Socialist Party distanced themselves from Chiesa. Craxi called Mario Chiesa mariuolo, or "villain", a "wild splinter" of the otherwise clean PSI. Upset over this treatment by his former colleagues, Chiesa began to give information about corruption implicating his colleagues. This marked the beginning of the Mani pulite investigation; news of political corruption began spreading in the press.

In 1992 general election, the Christian Democracy, led by Forlani, lost many votes, but its coalition managed to keep a small majority. However the largest opposition party, the PCI, split after the fall of the Soviet Union and there was no opposition leadership. Many votes went to Lega Nord, a party that was not inclined to alliances at the time. In the presidential election of the same year, the Christian Democracy proposed Forlani as his candidate to the presidency of the Republic. However, during the 5th and 6th ballots, held on 16 May 1992, Forlani missed the election of 39 and 29 votes respectively. Following these defeats, Forlani withdrew his candidacy as President of the Republic.

Resignation and decline
The defeat in the presidential election, shortly after the dramatic general election, marked the conclusion of Forlani's political life, who, after other defeats in regional and administrative elections and involvement in Mani pulite scandal, in which he was charged of having received illegal funds, resigned as party Secretary in October 1992 and subsequently retired from politics.

His former spokesman, Pier Ferdinando Casini, is considered Forlani's politics direct heir.

Electoral history

References

External links

1925 births
Living people
People from Pesaro
Christian Democracy (Italy) politicians
Prime Ministers of Italy
Deputy Prime Ministers of Italy
Foreign ministers of Italy
Italian Ministers of Defence
Deputies of Legislature III of Italy
Deputies of Legislature IV of Italy
Deputies of Legislature V of Italy
Deputies of Legislature VI of Italy
Deputies of Legislature VII of Italy
Deputies of Legislature VIII of Italy
Deputies of Legislature IX of Italy
Deputies of Legislature X of Italy
Deputies of Legislature XI of Italy
Candidates for President of Italy
Politicians of Marche
Italian anti-communists